Eucera cinnamomea is a bee in the family Apidae and the subfamily Apinae.

References 

Apinae
Insects described in 1935